The 1983–84 Primeira Divisão was the 50th season of top-tier football in Portugal.

Overview
It was contested by 16 teams, and S.L. Benfica won the championship.

League standings

Results

Season statistics

Top goalscorers

References

External links
 Portugal 1983-84 - RSSSF (Jorge Miguel Teixeira)
 Portuguese League 1983/84 - footballzz.co.uk
 Portugal - Table of Honor - Soccer Library 

Primeira Liga seasons
1983–84 in Portuguese football
Portugal